Larder Lake is a freshwater lake in Timiskaming District in Northeastern Ontario, Canada. The lake straddles the incorporated (municipal) townships of Larder Lake and McGarry and geographic McFadden Township. It is part of the Saint Lawrence River drainage basin and is the source of the Larder River.

Geography 
Larder lake has two large arms, Southwest Arm and Northeast Arm, and four bays: Fitzpatrick Bay in the southwest; and Dublin Bay, Northwest Bay and Spoon Bay at the northwest. The major islands include Big Pete Island, Island CC and Island U.

Larder Lake has five named inflows: Sharp Creek and Benson Creek at the southwest; Pancake Creek to Northwest Bay; Bear Creek to the tip of Northeast Arm; and Milky Creek at the east. The primary outflow is the Larder River, at the southeast, which flows via the Blanche River, Lake Timiskaming and the Ottawa River to the Saint Lawrence River.

The community of Larder Lake (in the eponymous municipal township of Larder Lake) is located on the northwest shore of Spoon Bay, and the communities of Virginiatown and Kearns, both part of municipal McGarry township, are located at the northeast end of Northeast Arm.

Ontario Highway 66 travels in an east-west direction along the north side of the lake, and Ontario Highway 624 travels in a north-south direction along on the west side of the lake.

Economy
Forestry and recreational tourism are the main economic activities in the lake area.

Climate
The lake surface is generally frozen from mid-November to late April; however, the period of safe ice circulation is usually from mid-December to mid-April.

See also 

 Chief Tonene Lake

References 

Lakes of Timiskaming District